Canning City Soccer Club is a football (soccer) club, based in Willetton, Western Australia, who play their home games at the Willetton Sports Club. They were originally established as Canning Corinthians in 1972, that entity dissolving in 1992, before returning to the Western Australia State League in 2001 as Canning City Soccer Club.
The club currently (2019) competes in the Football West State League Division 2.

Club history
Canning Corinthians were formed in 1972, by David Schrandt and John Reilly, and began competing in the old Third Division of the Soccer Federation of WA. Success was not far off, as in 1976, Corinthians won promotion to the Second Division. Corinthians enjoyed 7 solid years in the second division, finishing in mid-table places before being relegated at the end of the 1983 season.

Although hoping to return to the Second Division, it was not to be, and only one season after finding themselves competing in this division they were relegated further to the Fourth Division. Three years of mid-high table finishes culminated in 2nd place in the league in 1988, and a return to Third Division football. Corinthians spent 3 years in this division, eventually winning it in 1991 to ensure a return to the old Second Division.

Corinthians spent one last successful season in the Second Division, finishing a respectable 7th place, however, off the field, plans were in place that would change the club. In 1993, Canning Corinthians merged with Melville Alemania to become the Leeming Strikers football club. The junior entity of Canning Corinthians remained, how ever policy was introduced by Football West that dictated that clubs could no longer use ethnic, or national, names or logos. The junior club was hence rebranded has Canning Cosmos.

By the 1980s Canning Corinthians had developed one of the largest junior clubs in Western Australia. Under the guidance of the soccer committee at the time, the club decided that it would again compete as a senior side in the semi-professional leagues, giving opportunity for the junior players to stay at the club and play in the senior divisions. The new team in the senior division took on the name of  Canning City Soccer, entering the State League First Division in 2001.

After only 7 years in the First Division, Canning City won promotion to the Premier League by 9pts over its nearest rival. The strong history of the junior soccer program was instrumental in this promotion as nearly all of the first team squad had played football at some stage for the Canning Cosmos.

Canning's debut in the Premier League started off considerably well taking points off Swan United FC, Inglewood United, Sorrento FC and Floreat Athena. However a poor 2nd half of the season saw the team slowly creep down the ladder, and only taking 2pts from 11 fixtures left the club bottom of the table. A 1–0 loss to Floreat Athena in the return fixture at Willetton Sports Club confirmed relegation for the club, as closest rivals Cockburn City were able to beat an under-strength Perth SC 2–0.

The team currently plays in division 2 of the state league which is the bottom tier of the state league.

Club honours

League record

The table below shows Canning City's final standings in past seasons.

External links
Official website
Football West
Football Federation Australia

Soccer clubs in Perth, Western Australia
Football West State League teams
Association football clubs established in 1972
1972 establishments in Australia